Gregory Halpern (born 1977) is an American photographer and teacher. He currently teaches at the Rochester Institute of Technology and is a nominee member of Magnum Photos..

Halpern has published a number of books of his own work; Zzyzx won PhotoBook of the Year at the 2016 Paris Photo–Aperture Foundation PhotoBook Awards. He received a Guggenheim Fellowship in 2014.

Life and work
Halpern grew up in Buffalo, New York. He holds a BA in history and literature from Harvard University and an MFA from California College of the Arts. He has taught at California College of the Arts, Cornell University, School of the Museum of Fine Arts, Boston, Harvard University and the Harvard Graduate School of Design. He currently teaches at the Rochester Institute of Technology.

Omaha Sketchbook (2009) is an artist's book portrait of the titular city. Harvard Works Because We Do (2003) is a book of photographs and text, presenting a portrait of Harvard University through the eyes of the school's service employees. A (2011) is a photographic ramble through the streets of the American Rust Belt. East of the Sun, West of the Moon is a collaboration with the photographer Ahndraya Parlato. Zzyzx (2016), named after Zzyzx, California, contains photographs from Los Angeles. Let the Sun Beheaded Be (2020)  was made over several months in the French archipelago of Guadeloupe.

In 2018 Halpern became a nominee member of Magnum Photos.

Publications

Publications by Halpern
 Harvard Works Because We Do. New York: Quantuck Lane/W.W. Norton, 2003. With an introduction by Studs Terkel
 Omaha Sketchbook. J&L, 2009.
 A. J&L, 2011.
 Zzyzx. London: Mack, 2016.
 Confederate Moons. Oakland, CA: TBW, 2018. . Annual Series 6, Book 3. Halpern, Guido Guidi, Jason Fulford, and Viviane Sassen each had one book in a set of four. Edition of 1000 copies.
 Let the Sun Beheaded Be. New York: Aperture, 2020. .

Publications with others
The Photographer's Playbook: 307 Assignments and Ideas. New York: Aperture, 2014. . Edited by Halpern and Jason Fulford.
East of the Sun, West of the Moon. Études Books N°8. Paris: Études, 2014. By Ahndraya Parlato and Halpern. . With a text by Nicholas Muellner. Edition of 300 copies. In English and French.

Awards
2014: Guggenheim Fellowship from the John Simon Guggenheim Memorial Foundation
2016: Zzyzx won PhotoBook of the Year, Paris Photo–Aperture Foundation PhotoBook Awards, Paris.

References

External links

Gregory Halpern On Documentary Ethics – Preoccupations, Subjectivity and Untruths (2013)

1977 births
Living people
People from Buffalo, New York
Harvard University alumni
California College of the Arts alumni
American photographers
Magnum photographers